Daniel Francisco Maté Badenes (born 1963/64) is a Spanish billionaire, and the owner of about 3% of Glencore.

Maté has degrees in economics and law, both from the University of Deusto.

Maté is in charge of zinc and lead marketing at Glencore.

Maté is married, with two children, and lives in the canton of Schwyz, Switzerland.

References

1960s births
Living people
Spanish billionaires
Spanish expatriates in Switzerland
20th-century Spanish businesspeople
21st-century Spanish businesspeople
People named in the Paradise Papers